The Ardennes classics are three cycling classics held in mid-April in the Belgian Ardennes and southern Limburg in the Netherlands: Liège–Bastogne–Liège, La Flèche Wallonne and  Amstel Gold Race. First held in 1892, 1936 and 1966 respectively, the races are notable for their hilly courses, and often have similar riders competing for the top positions as the races are held closely following each other. Cyclists that are specialized in these hilly courses are known as puncheurs. In recent years, the three classics have been held within an 8-day timeframe.

Since the late 2010s, all three of the men's races have been joined by equivalent races on the women's circuit: Amstel Gold Race for Women, La Flèche Wallonne Féminine and Liège–Bastogne–Liège Femmes.

History
Prior, there was already a points classification for the Belgian Ardennes classics, called Ardennes Weekend (combining La Flèche Wallonne and Liège–Bastogne–Liège).

With the introduction of the Amstel Gold race, originally between both races, the period between the Belgian classics was extended to 1,5 week. Since then, the original points classification became unofficial.

The only male winners of the "triple" are Davide Rebellin in 2004 (who was later banned for doping) and Philippe Gilbert in 2011. Gilbert also won the Brabantse Pijl, another important hill classic in mid-April, winning the "quadruple" that year. Other riders to win all three races, though not in a single year, are Danilo Di Luca (who later received a lifetime ban for doping), Michele Bartoli, Eddy Merckx and Bernard Hinault.

In 2017, women's races for all three of the Ardennes classics were held for the first time, with Liège–Bastogne–Liège Femmes making its debut alongside a revival of the Women's Amstel Gold Race, which had previously been held from 2001 to 2003, and La Flèche Wallonne Féminine, which has been held since 1998. Anna van der Breggen immediately clinched the triple by winning all three races, being followed by team-mate Lizzie Deignan in second and Katarzyna Niewiadoma in third in all three events.

There is no official competition connecting the three races, although there have been classifications in the past for the two Walloon races.

In recent years, these three hill classics are held in the second half of April, following a similar set of the Cobbled classics.

Later in the year, there are two similar 'trebles' in Italy: the Trittico Lombardo with the Tre Valli Varesine, Coppa Ugo Agostoni and Coppa Bernocchi in the Lombardy Region, and the Trittico di Autunno (Autumn Triptych) with Milano–Torino, Giro del Piemonte and Giro di Lombardia.

Winners since 1966

Statistics
 Active cyclists marked in bold.

Most Ardennes classics wins per male rider

Most Ardennes classics wins per female rider

See also
 Cobbled classics
 Classic cycle races

References

Sport in Wallonia
Cycling in Limburg (Netherlands)
South Limburg (Netherlands)
Ardennes